Ty Esler (born 10 September 1971) is a former Australian rules football player who played in the Australian Football League (AFL) between 1991 and 1993 for the Richmond Football Club. He later played for Victorian Football Association club Frankston.

References

 Hogan P: The Tigers Of Old, Richmond FC, Melbourne 1996

External links
 
 

1971 births
Living people
Richmond Football Club players
Frankston Football Club players
Australian rules footballers from Victoria (Australia)